Abu'l-Aswar Shavur ibn Manuchihr was the Kurdish Shaddadid emir of Ani, formerly an Armenian royal capital, from  1118 to 1124. 

A son and successor of Manuchihr b. Shavur, Abu'l-Aswar was accused by the contemporary Armenian historian Vardan Areveltsi of persecuting Christians and attempting to sell Ani to the emir of Kars. His rule was terminated by the resurgent King David IV of Georgia, whom Ani surrendered without a fight in 1124. Abu'l-Aswar Shavur ended his days as a captive of the Georgians in exile in Abkhazia, while Ani was given by David IV to his general, Abulet. Abu'l-Aswar Shavur's son Fadl would be able to resume the Shaddadid reign in Ani in 1125.

References 

Shaddadid emirs of Ani
12th-century rulers in Asia
Kurdish rulers
12th-century Kurdish people